The 1970–71 Rheinlandliga was the 19th season of the highest amateur class of the Rhineland Football Association under the name of 1. Amateurliga Rheinland. It was a predecessor of today's Rheinlandliga.

Results
SpVgg Andernach became Rheinland Champion.  Sportfreunde Eisbachtal represented Rhineland in the 1971 German Soccer Amateur Championship and lost in the quarterfinals against SC Jülich (Middle Rhine).

FV Rübenach and Eintracht Trier II had to move down to the 2. Amateur League. For the following 1971–72 season, ESG Betzdorf, SV Leiwen and SV Remagen moved up.

References

1970 in association football
Football in Rhineland-Palatinate
1971 in association football